Jacob Van Vechten Olcott (May 17, 1856 – June 1, 1940) was a U.S. Representative from New York.

Born in New York City, Olcott attended public schools, including the Thirteenth Street School. He also attended the College of the City of New York. He was graduated from the Columbia Law School at New York City in May 1877.

He was admitted to the bar on May 17, 1877, and commenced the practice of law in New York City in 1881. He served as member of the Civil Service Commission of New York City in 1895–1897. He was a trustee and vice president of St. Luke's Hospital, New York City.

Olcott was elected as a Republican to the Fifty-ninth, Sixtieth, and Sixty-first Congresses (March 4, 1905 – March 3, 1911). He was not a candidate for renomination in 1910. He continued the practice of law in New York City until his death on June 1, 1940. He was interred in Green-Wood Cemetery, Brooklyn, New York.

New York County D. A. William M. K. Olcott and mining engineer Eben Erskine Olcott were his brothers.

Sources

References

External links
 

1856 births
1940 deaths
American people of Dutch descent
Columbia Law School alumni
Burials at Green-Wood Cemetery
Republican Party members of the United States House of Representatives from New York (state)